The Barton Mystery is a 1916 play by the Anglo-American writer Walter C. Hackett. It was first performed at the Savoy Theatre in London, lasting for 165 performances. Its run in New York the following year was less successful and it closed after just twenty shows. The play mixes elements of a whodunit detective mystery with farce.

It has been turned into three films:
 The Barton Mystery, a 1920 silent British film 
 The Barton Mystery, a 1932 British film 
 The Barton Mystery, a 1949 French film

References

Bibliography
 Marvin Lachman. The Villainous Stage: Crime Plays on Broadway and in the West End. McFarland, 2014.

1916 plays
West End plays
British plays adapted into films
Plays set in England
Plays by Walter C. Hackett